The RISC System/6000 (RS/6000) is a family of RISC-based Unix servers, workstations and supercomputers made by IBM in the 1990s. The RS/6000 family replaced the IBM RT PC computer platform in February 1990 and was the first computer line to see the use of IBM's POWER and PowerPC based microprocessors. In October 2000, the RS/6000 brand was retired for POWER-based servers and replaced by the eServer pSeries. Workstations continued under the RS/6000 brand until 2002, when new POWER-based workstations were released under the IntelliStation POWER brand.

History 

The first RS/6000 models used the Micro Channel bus, later models used PCI. Some later models conformed to the PReP and CHRP standard platforms, which were co-developed with Apple and Motorola, with Open Firmware. The plan was to enable the RS/6000 to run multiple operating systems such as Windows NT, NetWare, OS/2, Solaris, Taligent, AIX and Mac OS but in the end only IBM's Unix variant AIX was used and supported on RS/6000. Linux is widely used on CHRP based RS/6000s, but support was added after the RS/6000 name was changed to eServer pSeries in 2000.

The RS/6000 family also included the POWERserver servers, POWERstation workstations and Scalable POWERparallel supercomputer platform. While most machines were desktops, desksides, or rack-mounted, there were laptop models too. Famous RS/6000s include the PowerPC 604e-based Deep Blue supercomputer that beat world champion Garry Kasparov at chess in 1997, and the POWER3-based ASCI White which was the fastest supercomputer in the world during 20002002.

Architecture

Hardware

Service processor 
Many RS/6000 and subsequent pSeries machines came with a service processor, which booted itself when power was applied and continuously ran its own firmware, independent of the operating system. The service processor could call a phone number (via a modem) in case of serious failure with the machine. Early advertisements and documentation called the service processor "System Guard", (or SystemGuard) although this name was apparently dropped later on, roughly around the same time that the simplified RS/6000 name was adopted for the computer line itself.

Late in the RS/6000 cycle, the service processor was "converged" with the one used on the AS/400 machines.

Software
POWER machines typically ran AIX. Solaris, OS/2 and Windows NT were also ported to PowerPC. Later Linux was also used.

Some AIX systems support IBM Web-based System Manager.

Models 
Some models were marketed under the RS/6000 POWERstation and POWERserver names.

Micro Channel-based lines 
The early lines was based on a IBM proprietary Micro Channel architecture - the same architecture that used in hi-end PS/2 x86 desktop line, and last MCA-based series was produced until 1999.

Type 7006

Type 7008 

These workstations were marketed under the PowerStation name.

Type 7009

Type 7010 

This type was for Xstations, IBM's line of X terminal.

Type 7011

Type 7012 and 7030 

The 380, 390, and 39H servers correspond to the 3AT, 3BT, and 3CT workstations.

Type 7013 and 7016 
The 7016-730 model was a version of 7013-530 model, but with licensed by Silicon Graphics graphics card.

Type 7015 
Uses a IBM 9309 Rack Enclosure; this a first generation RS/6000 server running AIX. These units were configured by IBM as experimental "NSS" ("Network Switching Subsystem") routers, and used on the NSFnet T3 backbone in the early/mid-90s.

PCI-based lines 
Produced since 1994 until the time were the RS/6000 line was rebranded to System P.

Type 7017

Type 7020

Type 7024

Type 7025

Type 7026

Type 7043 and 7248

Type 7044 (44P)

Type 7046

Type 7317

Laptops

Type 7007 

The Model N40 was a PowerPC-based laptop developed and manufactured by Tadpole Technology in conjunction with IBM. It was released on 25 March 1994, priced at US$12,000. The internal batteries could power the system for 45 minutes only and an external battery pack that lasted for 4 hours was available for this reason.

Type 7249

See also

References

General
 27 years of IBM RISC

External links
 A Brief History of RISC, the IBM RS/6000 and the IBM eServer pSeries IBM Archives
IBM RS6000 Support Forum
RS/6000 Machine Type Models

IBM workstations
IBM server computers
PowerPC computers
Computer-related introductions in 1990
IBM RS/6000
IBM RS/6000